In cell biology, TH9 cells (T helper type 9 cells, CD4+IL-9+IL-13−IFNγ − ) are a sub-population of CD4+T cells that produce interleukin-9 (IL-9). They play a role in defense against helminth infections, in allergic responses, in autoimmunity, and tumor suppression.

Characterization 

TH9 cells are characterized by their cell surface expression of CD4 and CCR6 and the lack of CCR4.  Additionally, they are defined by their high secretion of interleukin‑9. Besides IL-9, TH9 cells also produce IL-10 and IL-21. However, their functions in TH9 cells are still unclear.

Differentation 

Th9 cells can differentiate either from naive T lymphocytes or by a shift from TH2 cells. There are numbers of cytokines, transcription factors and other molecules, that have a role in TH9 differentiation.

Cytokines in differentiation 

Cytokines play a major role in development of TH9 cells. There are many cytokines impacting differentiation of TH9 cells and their production of IL-9 but IL-4 and TGF-β are indispensable for their development and polarization.

IL-4 and TGF-β are necessary for naive T lymphocytes to differentiate into TH9 cells. while TGF-β alone can switch TH2 cells into TH9 cells.

IL-2 is critical for interleukin-9 production by TH9 cells.

IL-1 may induce IL-9 in some cases, and IL-33 is able to induce IL-9 in T cells generally. Generally IL-1 family members enhance expression of Il9 gene.

IL-25 also induces IL-9 production in vivo.

Development of TH9 cells requires a balanced cytokines signaling for its establishment. All mentioned cytokines then signal through specific transcription factors, which are later on required for a TH9 polarization.

Transcription factors in differentiation 

STAT6, IRF4, GATA3 are absolutely required for TH9 cell development and other such as PU.1, BATF, NF-κB, NFAT1, STAT5, AP-1 contribute to TH9 sub-population commitment and to IL-9 production.

STAT6 is activated by signaling through IL-4 receptor. Once activated, phosphorylated STAT6 mediate the transcription of Gata3 and Irf4, which are both necessary for  polarization of TH9 cells. STAT6 repress the expression of  transcription factors T-bet and Foxp3 in TH9 cells, that normally block IL-9 production.

GATA-3  in TH9 cells development  represses transcriptional factor FOXP3, which would other wise let to other T helper cell subpopulation.

IRF4 binds to the promoter of Il-9 gene in TH9 cells and it is dependent on STAT6.

BATF has been also shown to bind to the Il-9 gene promoter and to activate Il-9gene transcription.

PU.1 works by directly binding to the promoter of Il-9 gene and attract chromatin-modifying enzymes which reinforce Il9-gene transcription.

NF-κB and NFAT1, are needed for a TCR-induced interleukin-9 production by TH9 cells.

STAT5, downstream factor of IL-2, induce TH9 cells IL-9. STAT5 directly bind to Il-9 gene promoter, although it has not yet been determined how important this pathway is for TH9 development in vitro and in vivo.

Molecules with regulatory effects 

Numbers of molecules enhance or dampen IL-9 production and contribute to TH9 development such as:

Activin A that can fully substitute the role of TGF-β in TH9 cells, then Jagged2, programmed cell death ligand (PD-L2), cyclooxy- genase (COX)-2, 1,25-dihydroxyvitamin D3, calcitonin gene-related peptide (CGRP), tumor necrosis factor receptor superfamily member 4 (TNFRSF4 or OX40), and thymic stromal lymphopoietin (TSLP).

Physiological functions 

The main physiological role of TH9 cells, while poorly defined, is defense against helminthic infections. This is likely mediated by local and/or systemic production of Interleukin-9, as well as promoted survival of other anti-parasitic leukocytes, including mast cells, eosinophils and basophils.

Th9 cells have also shown both pro- and anti-tumorigenic activity, depending on the type of cancer. They have been shown to inhibit melanoma cell growth, increase anti-tumor lymphocytes, and  drastically lower tumor mass and disease severity. On the other hand patients suffering hepatocellular carcinoma with high TH9 infiltration had shorter disease-free survival period after surgical resection.

Pathophysiological functions 
TH9 cells appear to be linked to many pathophysiological processes. Their exact role is poorly understood, as they appear to have a pleiotropic effect and seem to be heavily dependent on the local, as well as systemic, cytokine environment.

Allergies

TH9 cells are present in the peripheral blood of allergic patients while such a population is rare in non-allergic persons. Few studies have reported distinct correlations of in vivo IL-9 with serum IgE concentration. The percentages of IL-9-secreting T cells of atopic patients also correlated with serum IgE in adults with asthma.

Two studies showed that transferred TH9 cells result in allergic inflammation in the lung. It was also observed that TH9 cells can promote intestinal and central nervous system inflammation.

Asthma

TH9 cells are strongly linked to asthma given their presence in draining lymph nodes and airways.
TH9-Derived IL-9 has been shown to exacerbate the allergic immune response by enhancing antibody production and increasing cell infiltration inside of the respiratory tract.

Autoimmune inflammation

TH9 cells contribute to ulcerative colitis, due to the cell’s ability to impair cellular repair, as well as due to the ability of secreted IL-9 to promote a TH2-like immune response. This may also play a role in TH9 tumor suppression (see "Physiological functions" above). TH9 have been shown to play a role in both early and progressive phase of multiple sclerosis by decreasing the effects of pro-inflammatory TH17. Increased levels of IL-9, mainly produced by TH9 have been detected in patients in remission phase of the disease. However, in vitro differentiated Th9 have been shown to induce EAE and cause peripheral neuropathies in mice, emphasizing the importance of context in which the cells develops and functions.

Chronic infections 
A higher percentage of TH9 cells in patients with chronic HCV was linked to higher levels of liver enzymes, more severe disease progression and faster development of HCC. Also remission and faster HCV clearance was associated with lower TH9 cytokines' levels. This might be caused by TH9 mediated promotion of TH17 phenotype and hindering of TH1 phenotype which leads to persisting viral infection. There were several publications trying to elucidate role of TH9 cells in chronic HBV infection with inconsistent results.

References 

Immune system
Cell biology
Immunology